Gérard López Fojaca (born 27 December 1971) is a Luxembourgish-Spanish businessman active in technology, energy and in sport. He is the co-founder (with Eric Lux) and chairman of Genii Capital. López has been the owner of French club FC Girondins de Bordeaux and Portuguese club Boavista FC since 2021. From 2009 to 2015, Lopez was president of the Lotus F1 Team. In 2022, Lopez launched The Lydian Group, a tech conglomerate operating across the digital assets space. As a co-founder, he was the owner of Mangrove Capital Partners from 2000 to 2014.

Early life
López grew up in a soot-covered house next to a steel mill in Luxembourg. He was recruited to Miami University in Western Ohio to play basketball on a partial scholarship in 1998. He studied management and technology there. He also has a Graduat on Asian Art.

Career
While at university, he founded Icon Solutions, a web services company.

With Mark Tluszcz and Hans Jurgen Schmitz, he founded Mangrove Capital Partners, a Luxembourg-based leading venture capital company specialized in future oriented technologies. Mangrove Capital Partners was one of the first investors in Skype selling a minority position to eBay in 2005 as part of the $2.6 billion acquisition.

He founded with Eric Lux in 2008 Genii Capital, a finance consulting and investment managing firm. López sits on the board of Directors of WIx, Zink Imaging, Lotus F1 Team and is also a member of the Planning Advisory Committee of the Miami University Business School.

In 2015, he founded Nekton, an investment company and brokerage in energy field, active in South America, Africa, Asia and Eastern Europe. He is also the CEO of the company. 

López was formerly chairman of RISE Capital AB, which alongside Nekton, was a co-owner of RISE Capital AB Projects. Nekton divested itself of its interests in RISE in December 2020. 

Some of López's companies were said to have featured in the Panama Papers leak in 2016, however the International Consortium of Investigative Journalists released a statement to say: "No wrongdoing is being alleged by the ICIJ: 'There are legitimate uses for offshore companies and trusts. We do not intend to suggest or imply that any people, companies or other entities included in the ICIJ Offshore Leaks Database have broken the law or otherwise acted improperly.'"

In 2022, Lopez and his business partner, Greg Fishman, launched The Lydian Group, a tech conglomerate (company) operating across the digital assets space. The advisory board includes Mark Tluszcz and Andrea Rossi, the former CEO of AXA Investment Managers.

Sports
As a huge sports fan, López got into car racing via Eric Lux and Gravity Sport Management. He also participated in long-distance races with Gravity Racing International's team. In 2009, he bought out the Formula 1 Lotus F1 Team, making Genii Capital the majority owner of the team. While it possessed very few sponsors at the beginning, Microsoft, Unilever and Coca-Cola soon became team partners.

With Kick Partners and Mangrove Sport Business Intelligence, López takes care of the public image and the transfers of football players.

In October 2016, Lopez entered into exclusive talks with President Michel Seydoux for the acquisition of the Lille OSC football club, which he purchased and later sold. Lopez acquired Bordeaux in June 2021.

In Portugal, he is the owner of Boavista FC since 2021, a nationally-renowned sports club from Porto.

Political donations
In August 2016, it was reported that López had given the British Conservative Party £400,000, in support of his friend Zac Goldsmith as a candidate in the mayoral election at the time.

Personal life
López owns what is considered by some to be one of the best car collections in the world. It has been featured in Top Gear magazine and in local newspapers.

References

1971 births
Living people
Spanish businesspeople
Sports businesspeople
Luxembourgian sports businesspeople
Formula One team owners
Formula One team principals
Miami University alumni
Luxembourgian people of Spanish descent
Spanish people of Luxembourgian descent
Luxembourgian expatriates in Spain
Lille OSC non-playing staff
24H Series drivers
People named in the Panama Papers